Alan Rashaan Evans (born November 8, 1995) is an American football linebacker for the Atlanta Falcons of the National Football League (NFL). He was drafted by the Tennessee Titans in the first round of the 2018 NFL Draft. He played college football at Alabama.

High school career
A native of Auburn, Alabama, Evans attended Auburn High School, where he was teammates with Reuben Foster. He finished with 77 tackles (including 43 tackles for loss) and 17.5 sacks as a senior in high school, while adding five pass breakups, three forced fumbles, a blocked punt and a fumble recovery. He was recognized as first team ASWA 6A All-State selection as a junior in 2012 and also played in the Alabama-Mississippi All-Star Game. Evans was a five-star outside linebacker according to 247Sports, rated the eleventh best player in the country; the number one outside linebacker in the country; and the second highest recruit from the state of Alabama behind fellow Alabama commit Marlon Humphrey. He was recognized as an Under Armour All-American in 2014.

College career

Evans played college football at the University of Alabama. As a true freshman, Evans played on special teams in 13 games with 15 tackles (two for loss) and one sack. As a sophomore, Evans again mostly played as a special teamer and reserve outside linebacker in 2015, though his two sacks against Clemson in the national championship victory that season put him on many scouts' radars. Evans was a second-team All-SEC pick in 2017, starting 12 games, tying for the team lead with 74 tackles, leading the team with 13 tackles for loss, making six sacks, and breaking up three passes. In the team's two playoff games in 2016 (his only starts of the year), Evans made 18 tackles from an inside linebacker position. He had 53 total for the year, including four sacks, six quarterback hurries, and a forced fumble in 14 games. He started 14 games over his final two seasons and appeared in three CFP National Championship contests with two victories.

Evans graduated from Alabama in December 2017 with a degree in psychology.

Professional career

Tennessee Titans
The Tennessee Titans selected Evans in the first round (22nd overall) of the 2018 NFL Draft. Evans was the fifth linebacker drafted in 2018.

2018 season
On May 15, 2018, the Tennessee Titans signed Evans to a four-year, $11.7 million contract that includes a signing bonus of $6.59 million. 

Throughout training camp, Evans competed to be a starting inside linebacker against Will Compton and Jayon Brown. Head coach Mike Vrabel named Evans a backup inside linebacker to start the regular season, behind Wesley Woodyard and Will Compton.

Evans was inactive for the Tennessee Titans’ season-opening 27-20 loss at the Miami Dolphins due to a hamstring injury. On September 23, 2018, Evans made his first career start, as well as his first career tackle, against the Jacksonville Jaguars in a 9-6 Week 3 victory. In Week 13, Evans collected a season-high eight combined tackles (six solo) during a 26-22 victory against the New York Jets. Evans finished his rookie season with 53 combined tackles (33 solo) and a pass deflection in 15 games and seven starts.

2019 season
In Week 4, Evans made 10 combined tackles and made his first NFL sack during a 24-10 road win at the Atlanta Falcons. Evans was credited with half a sack after he sacked Matt Ryan with teammate Isaiah Mack. During Week 10 against the Kansas City Chiefs, Evans recovered a fumble forced by teammate David Long Jr. on running back Damien Williams and returned it for a 53 yard touchdown in the 35–32 victory.

2020 season

In Week 1 against the Denver Broncos on Monday Night Football, Evans was ejected for throwing a punch at tight end Jake Butt.

2021 season
The Titans declined to exercise the fifth-year option on Evans' contract on May 3, 2021, making him a free agent after the 2021 season.

Atlanta Falcons
On April 4, 2022, Evans signed a one-year contract with the Atlanta Falcons.

NFL statistics

Regular season

Postseason

Personal life
Evans is the second oldest of five children. He has one younger brother and three sisters. His father, Alan, was a running back at Auburn, and his mother, Chenavis, received four degrees from Auburn, including her doctorate. Evans' older sister was a cheerleader at Auburn, and, despite the family ties including his cousins attending Auburn, Evans chose to attend Alabama. Growing up in rural Alabama, Evans would chase wild horses to work on improving his speed and athleticism.

References

External links

Alabama Crimson Tide bio
Tennessee Titans bio

1995 births
Living people
Alabama Crimson Tide football players
American football linebackers
Auburn High School (Alabama) alumni
Players of American football from Alabama
Sportspeople from Auburn, Alabama
Tennessee Titans players
Atlanta Falcons players